Hymie Kloner (23 May 1929 – July 2010) was a South African professional footballer who won four caps for his national team and who played in the Football League for Birmingham City. He played as a right half.

Kloner was born in Lithuania, the son of Jewish parents. The family emigrated to South Africa when Kloner was a boy. Though his parents were not keen on his playing football, the principal of the Jewish Government School encouraged him, and he eventually played for the Marist Brothers club. In June and July 1950, the 21-year-old Kloner played four matches for the South Africa national football team against a touring Australia team.

Later that year he came to England as a triallist. He was taken on by Birmingham City, and played once in the Football League, on 2 December 1950, standing in for Len Boyd in the Second Division game away to Leeds United which Leeds won 3–0. Kloner returned to South Africa that same month, and continued his football career domestically with Rangers FC. He played representative football for Southern Transvaal, and in 1954 played against a touring Israeli team.

In later life Kloner took up bowls. He died in July 2010.

Notes
A.  The Jewish Report, while confirming Kloner's appearance for the Southern Transvaal side against the touring Israelis, also suggests that he played for the South African national team in the 1 May 1954 test match, though the RSSSF would disagree.

References

1929 births
2010 deaths
Soccer players from Johannesburg
South African people of Lithuanian-Jewish descent
South African soccer players
South Africa international soccer players
Association football midfielders
Birmingham City F.C. players
Rangers F.C. (South Africa) players
English Football League players
Jewish footballers
South African Jews
Lithuanian Jews
Lithuanian emigrants to South Africa